Rathmell is a surname. Notable people with the surname include:

 Kimryn Rathmell (born 1969), American physician-scientist
 Lilian Rathmell (1909–2000), British artist 
 Malcolm Rathmell (born 1949), British motorcycle trials rider